Crawford House may refer to:

Canada
Crawford House, Toronto, Ontario School house at the University of Toronto Schools

United States
(by state then city)
 W.D. Crawford House, Cisco, Arkansas, listed on the National Register of Historic Places (NRHP) in Carroll County
 Crawford Hill Mansion, Denver, Colorado, listed on the NRHP in downtown Denver
 Crawford House (Manitou Springs, Colorado)
 Crawford House (Steamboat Springs, Colorado), NRHP-listed
 Crawford-Talmadge House, Hampton, Georgia, listed on the NRHP in Henry County
 Crawford-Shirley House, Lavonia, Georgia, listed on the NRHP in Georgia
 Crawford-Dorsey House and Cemetery, Lovejoy, Georgia, NRHP-listed
 Crawford-Whitehead-Ross House, Madison, Indiana, listed on the NRHP in Indiana
 Crawford House (Des Moines, Iowa), listed on the NRHP in Iowa
 Crawford House (Perryville, Kentucky), listed on the NRHP in Kentucky
 Crawford House (Somerset, Kentucky), listed on the NRHP in Kentucky
 Crawford House (Boston, Massachusetts), former hotel in Scollay Square
 Elias Crawford House, Worcester, Massachusetts, NRHP-listed
 Crawford House (Biloxi, Mississippi), a Mississippi Landmark
 Cahn-Crawford House, Meridian, Mississippi, NRHP-listed
 Crawford House (Crawford Notch, New Hampshire), a grand hotel in New Hampshire
 Crawford House Artist's Studio, Carroll, New Hampshire, NRHP-listed
 Crawford House (Toms River, New Jersey), listed on the NRHP in New Jersey
 John I Crawford Farm, Crawford, New York, NRHP-listed
 David Crawford House, Newburgh, New York, NRHP-listed
 Crawford House (Clinton, Oklahoma), listed on the NRHP in Oklahoma
 William Crawford House, Carmichaels, Pennsylvania, NRHP-listed
 John Minor Crawford House, Glassworks, Pennsylvania, NRHP-listed
 Crawford's Plantation House, Edisto Island, South Carolina, NRHP-listed
 Robert A. Crawford House, Chamberlain, South Dakota, listed on the NRHP in South Dakota
 Crawford-Pettyjohn House, Pierre, South Dakota, NRHP-listed
 Gideon Crawford House, Maryville, Tennessee, listed on the NRHP in Tennessee
 Theophilus Crawford House, Putney, Vermont, NRHP-listed
 Crawford-Gardner House, Charleston, West Virginia, NRHP-listed